The People First Party, was a political party in South Korea, led by Sim Dae-pyung and Shin Kook-hwan. A breakaway from the United Liberal Democrats, its profile was conservative. The party was based in the central provinces of Chungcheong. It had five seats in the South Korean parliament.

On February 12, 2008, the People's First Party announced that it was merging with the Liberty Forward Party led by Lee Hoi-chang. Because the new party took the Liberty Forward Party name, the party was essentially dissolved.

References

Conservative parties in South Korea
Defunct political parties in South Korea
Political parties established in 2005
Liberty Korea Party